The National Cancer Research Institute (NCRI) is a UK-wide partnership between cancer research funders, which promotes collaboration in cancer research. Its member organizations work together to maximize the value and benefit of cancer research for the benefit of patients and the public. Rather than replace or duplicate any of the functions of its members, it seeks to add value through joint planning, coordination and collaboration.

History
In May 1999, the UK Prime Minister held a Downing Street Cancer Summit which led to the formation of the Cancer Research Funders Forum, bringing together the main government and charitable agencies that fund cancer research in the UK for the first time.

Ian Gibson MP, a former cancer researcher from the University of East Anglia, called for the creation of a UK National Cancer Institute in November 1998, modelled on the National Cancer Institute in the USA. He used his influence as a member of the British House of Commons Science and Technology Committee to promote the idea and, in early 2000 the committee held an inquiry into the funding of cancer research in the UK which reported in July 2000, recommending "the creation of a new National Cancer Research Institute to set national research priorities and to co-ordinate and fund cancer research in the UK."

Soon afterwards, in September 2000, the Department of Health published their first NHS Cancer Plan which announced that the Department would work with the Cancer Research Funders Forum to create a National Cancer Research Institute which would take a more proactive role in the strategic co-ordination of cancer research.

The NCRI was formally launched on 1 April 2001.

Activities
Current activities of the NCRI include:

 maintaining a database of cancer research in the UK, which forms part of the International Cancer Research Portfolio (a database of publicly funded US and UK cancer research). The database is updated annually and analyses of the UK data are published every few years.
 organising the annual NCRI Cancer Conference, now established as the largest cancer research conference in the UK.
 developing a plan to network UK cancer registries and to encourage epidemiological research.
 setting up an initiative to revitalise UK radiotherapy research by networking and supporting individuals and groups, developing infrastructure and an integrated strategy.
 a strategic role in the development and oversight of the National Cancer Research Network to provide the infrastructure necessary to improve the speed, quality and integration of clinical trials in the UK.

The NCRI has also been responsible for:

 setting up a network of experimental cancer medicine centres to ensure that discoveries in basic science are translated into potential new cancer treatments as rapidly as possible.
 publishing reports on several key areas of cancer research, including prostate cancer, lung cancer, radiotherapy, palliative care and prevention, many of which have led onto the establishment of specific initiatives to fund aspects of research in these fields where a strategic gap was identified.
 establishing the National Cancer Intelligence Network

The NCRI was, and remains, a leader in the introduction of patient/public involvement in clinical research. The NCRI Consumer Liaison Group was founded in 2000 and is administered by the National Cancer Research Network (NCRN).  In the NCRI's early years the Chair of the Consumer Liaison Group was an NCRI Board member ex-officio. Since 2007 two patient/public Board appointments have been made following open advertisement.

Member organisations
 Biotechnology and Biological Sciences Research Council
Bloodwise
Brain Tumour Research
 Breast Cancer Now
 Cancer Research UK
 Chief Scientist Office (Scotland)
Children With Cancer UK
Department of Health
Health and Care Research Wales
Health And Social Care - Research and Development (Northern Ireland)
 Macmillan Cancer Support
 Marie Curie
 Medical Research Council
Pancreatic Cancer Research Fund
Prostate Cancer UK
Tenovus Cancer Care
 Wellcome Trust

See also 
 Cancer in the United Kingdom

References

Sources

 Waxman and Gibson - Britain needs a national cancer institute, British Medical Journal 1998 317: 1397
 Department of Health website: Research Priority Areas - Cancer (http://www.dh.gov.uk/PolicyAndGuidance/ResearchAndDevelopment/ResearchPriorityAreas/ResearchPriorityAreasArticle/fs/en?CONTENT_ID=4032197&chk=pfB%2Bi6) accessed 27 Oct 2006.
 NCRI website (http://www.ncri.org.uk) accessed 27 Oct 2006

External links
National Cancer Research Institute
National Cancer Research Network
NCRI Cancer Conference
National Cancer Intelligence Network

Cancer organisations based in the United Kingdom
Medical research institutes in the United Kingdom
2001 establishments in the United Kingdom
Organizations established in 2001